Tiger Queens: The Tiger King Musical is a Netflix musical based on Tiger King, which debuted on TikTok on March 28, 2021. The production features former RuPaul's Drag Race contestants Kim Chi, Willam, and Heidi N Closet portraying Carole Baskin, Joe Exotic and a tiger, respectively.

References

2021 musicals
TikTok